Les Morgan (born 24 February 1933) was a Welsh welterweight boxer from Risca, near Newport in South Wales. In 1957, he became Wales welterweight boxing champion.

Morgan won the 1953 Amateur Boxing Association British welterweight title, when boxing out of the Rotax ABC.

References

1933 births
Welterweight boxers
Living people
Welsh male boxers